Seray Altay (born August 28, 1987) is a Turkish volleyball player. She is 182 cm and plays as opposite. She plays for Galatasaray Medical Park.

Career
With VakıfBank Güneş Sigorta Türk Telekom Seray won the 2010–11 CEV Champions League.

Awards

Clubs
 2010/11 CEV Champions League -  Champion, with VakıfBank Güneş Sigorta Türk Telekom
 2011-12 Turkish Cup -  Runner-up, with Galatasaray Daikin
 2011-12 CEV Cup -  Runner-up, with Galatasaray Daikin

See also
 Turkish women in sports

References

External links
FIVB Profile
Player profile at galatasaray.org

1987 births
Living people
Sportspeople from Ankara
Turkish women's volleyball players
Eczacıbaşı volleyball players
Yeşilyurt volleyballers
Galatasaray S.K. (women's volleyball) players
Sarıyer Belediyesi volleyballers
Beşiktaş volleyballers
20th-century Turkish sportswomen
21st-century Turkish sportswomen